Pretty Yende  (born 6 March 1985) is a South African operatic soprano. She has performed leading roles at opera houses internationally, including La Scala and the Metropolitan Opera.

Early life and education
Born in Piet Retief, Mpumalanga, Yende was inspired to learn opera at age 16 after seeing a British Airways TV advertisement that featured the Flower Duet from Lakmé. She subsequently enrolled at the South African College of Music, where her teachers included Virginia Davids, and from which she graduated cum laude. She also graduated from the Accademia Teatro alla Scala in Milan, Italy. Her younger sister, Nombulelo Yende, is also an opera singer.

Yende won two prizes in the 2008 International Vocal Competition 's-Hertogenbosch: the Prize of the Province of North Brabant, and the Engagement Opera Riga, which gave her the opportunity to take part in the new year concert at the Latvian National Opera in December. She won first prize in operetta and opera at the International Hans Gabor Belvedere Singing Competition 2009 in Vienna.
In 2010, Yende won first prizes at three competitions: 1st Vincenzo Bellini International Competition, 1st International Singing Competition of Savonlinna Opera Festival (shared), 6th Leyla Gencer Voice Competition. In 2011, she won first prize at Operalia, held that year in Moscow.

Career
Yende performed Berenice in L'occasione fa il ladro (2010) and Elvira in L'italiana in Algeri (2011) as part of the academy at La Scala, where she sang four roles next season: the Priestess (Aida), Barbarina (The Marriage of Figaro), Norina (Don Pasquale), Musetta (La bohème).
Alongside Bryan Adams and Andrea Bocelli, she appeared in the closing concert of the 2010 FIFA World Cup on 9 July 2010, two days before the final.
She was featured in Bocelli's Live in Central Park concert on 15 September 2011, which was aired on PBS's Great Performances and physically released as Concerto: One Night in Central Park. They united in the concert entitled Amore e perdono held by the Fetzer Institute at the Basilica of Saint Francis of Assisi on 22 September 2012, which was aired on Rai 1 on 29 September 2012.

Yende made her Metropolitan Opera debut in New York City on 17 January 2013, in the role of Adèle in Rossini's Le comte Ory, as a substitute for Nino Machaidze. She subsequently stepped in for Cecilia Bartoli in the same role at the Theater an der Wien. In July 2014, she returned to La Scala for Le comte Ory, alternating Countess Adèle with Aleksandra Kurzak. Later in the year, she returned to New York for The Magic Flute (Pamina) at the Met, and between the performances she sang at the Richard Tucker Gala and made her Carnegie Hall debut in a solo recital. In 2015 she portrayed Susanna in Mozart's The Marriage of Figaro at the Los Angeles Opera. In 2016 she portrayed Rosina in The Barber of Seville and the title role in Lucia di Lammermoor at the Paris Opera.

Yende is credited as a primary artist for the "Ode À L'Humanité" (Ode to Humanity, previously called Aria) track on the Yanni/Plácido Domingo collaboration Inspirato (2014).

In 2018, she portrayed Adina in Bartlett Sher's production of L'elisir d'amore at the Metropolitan Opera, which ran through January and February.

Incident in Paris 
Yende accused French border police of police brutality and racial discrimination. She detailed on social media her experience of being treated like a criminal at Charles de Gaulle Airport on 21 June 2021 while arriving for her fourth La sonnambula performance at the Théâtre des Champs-Élysées. She said she was strip searched and held in a dark room with all her belongings taken. The French National Police disputed that it was she that had a South African passport without a visa to enter. She did present her residence permit issued in Milan, with which she had always travelled throughout Europe, yet they said she needed a separate one-time visa, while Yende and her lawyer claimed she had all the documents required. They also denied having ordered her to undress but a pat-down by a female officer in accordance to standard procedure, and she left around 6 pm with a regularisation visa.

DIRCO, aware of the incident, demanded explanation and investigation from the French authorities through the South African Embassy in Paris. It also voiced their intention to démarche the French Ambassador to South Africa, based in Pretoria, to convey its displeasure.

Awards and honours
Yende was awarded Siola d'oro in 2011.
She won an Arca d'oro Italia Young Talents Award in 2012, and performed a recital in Turin on 30 March 2013 owing to the award.

She was conferred the Silver Order of Ikhamanga on 27 April 2013. In a statement by the chairperson of the National Orders Advisory Council, Dr. Cassius Lubisi, Yende was conferred the honour "for her excellent achievement and international acclaim in the field of world opera and serving as a role model to aspiring young musicians."

She was one of the winners of the 2013 Women of the Year Awards by Glamour South Africa.
In September 2013 she received an Mbokodo Award in the category of opera.

Yende won the Best Recording Solo Recital Award for her album A Journey in the 2017 International Opera Awards, and was awarded the International Achiever Award in the 23rd South African Music Awards. She won a Readers' Award in the 2018 International Opera Awards, and the Cologne Opera Award (Kölner Opernpreis), received during the city's Floraball.
In 2019, she was invested a Knight of the Order of the Star of Italy.

Discography
Yende signed a long-term recording contract with Sony Classical in October 2015. Her first recording under this Sony contract was "A Journey".
 2016: A Journey; Marco Armiliato conducting RAI National Symphony Orchestra (Sony)
 2017: Dreams; Giacomo Sagripanti conducting Orchestra Sinfonica di Milano Giuseppe Verdi (Sony)

Opera roles

 Berenice, L'occasione fa il ladro (Rossini)
 Elvira, L'italiana in Algeri (Rossini)
 Priestess, Aida (Verdi)
 Barbarina, The Marriage of Figaro (Mozart)
 Norina, Don Pasquale (Donizetti)
 Musetta, La bohème (Puccini)
 Comtesse Adèle, Le comte Ory (Rossini)
 Lucia, Lucia di Lammermoor (Donizetti)
 Micaëla, Carmen (Bizet)
 Juliette, Roméo et Juliette (Gounod)
 Fiorilla, Il turco in Italia (Rossini)
 Pamina, The Magic Flute (Mozart)
 Rosina, The Barber of Seville (Rossini)
 Susanna, The Marriage of Figaro (Mozart)
 Adina, L'elisir d'amore (Donizetti)
 Elvira, I puritani (Bellini)
 Amira, Ciro in Babilonia (Rossini)
 Marie, La fille du régiment (Donizetti)
 Zoraide, Ricciardo e Zoraide (Rossini)
 Leïla, Les pêcheurs de perles (Bizet)
 Amina, La sonnambula (Bellini)
 Violetta, La traviata (Verdi)
 Manon, Manon (Massenet)
 Stella\Olympia\Antonia\Giulietta, Tales of Hoffmann (Offenbach)

See also

 List of alumni of the University of Cape Town
 List of South African musicians
 Music of South Africa

References

External links
 
 Pretty Yende on Sony Masterworks
 Profile at Medici.tv
 "Take 5 – Pretty Yende", Opera News, December 2014

1985 births
Living people
Zulu people
People from Mkhondo Local Municipality
South African operatic sopranos
South African College of Music alumni
Sony Classical Records artists
Operalia, The World Opera Competition prize-winners
Recipients of the Order of Ikhamanga
21st-century South African women opera singers